Steven Benjamin Hammond (born May 9, 1957) is a former Major League Baseball outfielder who played for one season. He played in 46 games for the Kansas City Royals during the 1982 Kansas City Royals season. He went on to a productive career with the Nankai Hawks, where he batted .274 with 9 home runs in  season.

External links

1957 births
Living people
Major League Baseball outfielders
Baseball players from Georgia (U.S. state)
Gulf Coast State Commodores baseball players
Kansas City Royals players
Nankai Hawks players
West Palm Beach Expos players
Spokane Indians players
American expatriate baseball players in Japan